The 2001–02 Hawaii Rainbow Warriors basketball team represented the University of Hawaiʻi at Mānoa in the 2001–02 NCAA Division I men's basketball season. The Rainbow Warriors, led by head coach Riley Wallace, played their home games at the Stan Sheriff Center in Honolulu, Hawaii, as members of the Western Athletic Conference. The Rainbow Warriors shared the WAC regular season championship with Tulsa, and earned the top seed in the WAC tournament. Hawaii won all three games in the WAC tournament by double figures, winning the WAC tournament for the second straight year with a 73–59 victory over Tulsa.

As WAC tournament champions, Hawaii earned an automatic bid to the NCAA tournament, and were given the 10th seed in the West region. The Rainbow Warriors were eliminated in the first round of the tournament, losing to Xavier, 70–58.

The Rainbow Warriors finished the season with a record of 27–6, which was a school record for most wins in a single season.

Roster 

Source

Schedule and results

|-
!colspan=9 style=|Exhibition

|-
!colspan=9 style=|Regular season

|-
!colspan=9 style=| WAC tournament

|-
!colspan=9 style=| NCAA tournament

Source

References

Hawaii Rainbow Warriors basketball seasons
Hawaii
Hawaii
Hawaii men's basketball
Hawaii men's basketball